Portugal competed in the Junior Eurovision Song Contest 2022 in Armenia, which was held on 11 December 2022 in Yerevan. Portuguese broadcaster RTP is responsible for the participation, and selected Nicolas Alves to represent the country, after being the runner-up on the third season of The Voice Kids, due to the actual winner Maria Gil having been born in November 2007.

Background 

Portugal provisionally confirmed their participation in the  contest, but ultimately withdrew due to the COVID-19 pandemic. In the 2021 contest in Paris, France, Simão Oliveira represented the Portugal with the song "O Rapaz". He finished in 11th place with 101 points, and gained the best result in the history of the country at the Junior Eurovision Song Contest.

Before Junior Eurovision

Artist selection 

Portuguese broadcaster RTP once again used the format The Voice Kids to select its representative for the Junior Eurovision Song Contest. Due to the fact that the age range to participate in the show differs from the Junior Eurovision participation age range, the winner wasn't automatically confirmed to be the Portuguese representative in the contest. In the final, held on 31 July 2022, Maria Gil emerged as the winner of the season, marking Fernando Daniel's second consecutive win as a coach. However, Gil could not represent Portugal due to being over the age limit at the time of the contest in Yerevan. On 10 August, RTP confirmed that one of the runners-up, Nicolas Alves, was selected to represent Portugal, as he received the second biggest amount of votes to win the competition.

At Junior Eurovision 
After the opening ceremony, which took place on 5 December 2022, it was announced that Portugal would perform thirteenth on 11 December 2022, following United Kingdom and preceding Serbia.

Voting

Detailed voting results

References 

Portugal
Junior Eurovision Song Contest